Aleksandar Rakić (born 17 January 1987) is a Serbian professional footballer who plays as a forward.

Club career
Rakić began his career in 2005 with Cement Beočin in Serbian League Vojvodina.

In 2013 Aleksandar moved to Armenian Premier League where he scored 22 goals in 70 games for Ararat Yerevan and Gandzasar Kapan.

Chennai City FC
In February 2018 Rakić joined I-League club Chennai City as a replacement for Murilo de Almeida.

He made his debut in a 0-0 draw against Mohun Bagan.
He scored his first goal in a 3-1 home win against Churchill Brothers.

PS TIRA
In March 2018, he moved to Southeast Asia from India to join and play for Indonesia club PS TIRA of the Liga 1 after he was sold by Chennai City.

Career statistics

Honours
Cement Beočin
Vojvodina League West: Runner-up 2009–10

Maziya
Malé League: 2017
Maldivian FA Charity Shield: 2017

Individual
Liga 1 Top Goalscorer: 2018

Footnotes

References

External links

1987 births
Living people
Footballers from Novi Sad
Serbian footballers
Serbian expatriate footballers
Association football forwards
FK Cement Beočin players
FC Ararat Yerevan players
FC Gandzasar Kapan players
FK Inđija players
Maziya S&RC players
Hapoel Marmorek F.C. players
Chennai City FC players
PS TIRA players
Madura United F.C. players
PS Barito Putera players
FK Krupa players
Persikabo 1973 players
FK Radnički Sremska Mitrovica players
Serbian First League players
Armenian Premier League players
Dhivehi Premier League players
Liga Leumit players
I-League players
Liga 1 (Indonesia) players
Premier League of Bosnia and Herzegovina players
Expatriate footballers in Armenia
Serbian expatriate sportspeople in Armenia
Expatriate footballers in Israel
Serbian expatriate sportspeople in Israel
Expatriate footballers in the Maldives
Serbian expatriate sportspeople in the Maldives
Expatriate footballers in India
Serbian expatriate sportspeople in India
Expatriate footballers in Indonesia
Serbian expatriate sportspeople in Indonesia
Expatriate footballers in Bosnia and Herzegovina
Serbian expatriate sportspeople in Bosnia and Herzegovina